Foxhills is a golf club and resort located in Ottershaw, Surrey, United Kingdom. It was established in 1975 and named for Charles James Fox on whose former estate it's located.

Foxhills is credited with helping launch the career of Ryder Cup player Paul Casey through the Foxhills Foundation junior golf programme. As of 2019, it was one of only two venues to twice serve as host green to the PGA Tour, the first time in 2017 and the second in 2021.

References

External links

Golf clubs and courses in Surrey
Ottershaw
1975 establishments in England
Sports venues completed in 1975